Zenon Frantsyskovych Kuzelia (23 June 1882 – 24 May 1952) was a prominent Ukrainian linguist, bibliographer, historian, journalist, and civil activist.

He was born in a family of forestry in the village of Poruchyn (today's in Ternopil Raion). Kuzelia studied at Berezhany gymnasium where he organized a secret club called "Young Ukraine". After finishing the gymnasium in 1900, he enrolled in the Lviv University. Kuzelia, however, soon moved to Vienna, where he continued to study at the University of Vienna and headed the Ukrainian student society "Sich". After graduating he worked in Vienna, and in 1909 he moved to Chernivtsi, while also becoming a member of the Shevchenko Scientific Society in Lviv.

With the start of the World War I Kuzelia moved back to Vienna, where he worked for a community. From 1916 to 1920 he conducted a culturally educational work for the interned in the camp near Salzwedel (Germany).

After moving to Berlin, Kuzelia was an editor of a journal called "Ukrainske Slovo" (Ukrainian Word) and publications such as "Ukrainische Kulturberichte" and "Ukrains'ka Nakladnya". In 1943 there was published a big "Ukrainian-German dictionary" that was edited by Zenon Kuzelia and Jaroslav Rudnyckyj, which even to this day is an unsurpassed work.

From 1944 to 1952 Kuzelia worked in Munich as a head of the Ukrainian Student Assistance Commission which helped the Ukrainian students abroad. Along with it he continued to work in mentioned publications and was a co-author of the first part of Encyclopedia of Ukraine (Munich - New-York, 1949). In 1949 Kuzelia was appointed the head of the Shevchenko Scientific Society.

Since 1951 Kuzelia lived in Paris.

Bibliography 
 Pohrebennyk, F. "Kuzelya Zenon Frantsyskovcyh" (Encyclopedia. Ukrainian Language.) "Ukrainian Encyclopedia". Kiev, 2000. 
 Volynets, N. "Name which will say a lot". "Zhaivir". 1992
 Demsky, M. "Another one from undeservedly forgotten ones". "Ukrainske slovo". 1994.

External links
 Mykola Mushynka, Kuzelia, Zenon Internet Encyclopedia of Ukraine 

1882 births
1952 deaths
People from Ternopil Oblast
20th-century Ukrainian historians
Linguists from Ukraine
Ukrainian language activists
Members of the Shevchenko Scientific Society
Ukrainian art historians
20th-century linguists
20th-century Ukrainian journalists